John Tonge may refer to:
John Tonge (cricketer) (1865–1903), English cricketer
John Tonge (MP), MP for Leicester in 1407

See also
John Tonge Centre, mortuary in Queensland, Australia